The Promised Land is a 1925 French silent film directed by Henry Roussel and starring Pierre Blanchar, Raquel Meller and André Roanne.

The film's sets were designed by the art director Robert Dumesnil.

Cast
 Pierre Blanchar as David  
 Raquel Meller as Lia 
 André Roanne as André d'Orlinsky, le jeune ingénieur  
 Max Maxudian as Moise Sigoulim  
 Henriette Moret as La rabbitzine Binnah  
 Jean De Sauvejunte as Le rabbin Samuel  
 Marie-Louise Vois as Madame Sigoulim  
 Albert Bras as Le rabbin Samuel Sigoulim 
 Robby Guichard as André  
 Pierrette Lugand as Lia  
 Jean Rauzena as David  
 Uribe (actress) as Esther

References

Bibliography
 Dayna Oscherwitz & MaryEllen Higgins. The A to Z of French Cinema. Scarecrow Press, 2009.

External links

1925 films
Films directed by Henry Roussel
French silent films
French black-and-white films
1920s French films